is a 2011 Japanese horror film written and directed by Kōichi Tsubaki and starring Reina Fujie and Ren Yagami.

Cast
 Reina Fujie 
 Ren Yagami
 Mayuka Okada
 Saori Yamamoto
 Mitsuo Hamada
 Midori Isomura
 Shigeru Saiki

References

External links
  

Japanese ghost films
Japanese horror films
2011 horror films
2011 films
2010s Japanese films